Catch.er is a 2018 Nollywood whodunit film directed by Walter Banger Taylaur. The criminal investigative film stars, OC Ukeje, Beverly Naya, Blossom Chukwujekwu and Tope Tedela

Synopsis 
A dedicated career woman was found murdered on her anniversary day. The case was given to two officers who unravelled different mysteries as the case deepens.

Premiere 
The movie was opened to Cinema on October 13, 2017.

Cast 
OC Ukeje, Blossom Chukuwujekwu, Beverley Naya, Alexx Ekubo, Gbenro Ajibade, Omowunmi Dada, Wofai Fada, Kiki Omeili and Tope Tedela

See also
List of Nigerian films of 2018

References 

2018 films
Nigerian crime drama films
English-language Nigerian films